Anthony Ricardo Fiorillo is a senior fellow at the Institute for the Study of Earth and Man at Southern Methodist University, but for many years he was vice president of research & collections and chief curator at the Perot Museum of Nature & Science. A native of Connecticut, he received his bachelor's at the University of Connecticut, his master's at the University of Nebraska and a Ph.D. in Vertebrate Paleontology from the University of Pennsylvania.

Career
Dr. Fiorillo worked on his Rea Postdoctoral Fellowship at the Carnegie Museum of Natural History in Pittsburgh, Pennsylvania and later as a scientist at the University of California, Berkeley. In 1995 he became a curator at the Dallas Museum of Natural History (now the Perot Museum of Nature and Science). He is currently the Executive Director of the New Mexico Museum of Natural History and Science and works as an adjunct associate professor of Paleontology at Southern Methodist University. He has worked with the National Park Service in several national park units including Big Bend National Park, Denali National Park, Aniakchak National Monument, and Wrangell-St. Elias National Park to identify, study and preserve dinosaur fossils found. In 2008, he was honored with a fellowship in the Geological Society of America.  For his long-time commitment to dinosaur paleontology within the National Park units in Alaska, he was recognized by the international George Wright Society in 2019 with the prestigious Natural Resource Achievement Award.

Since 1998 the primary focus of his work has been on polar dinosaurs, and more specifically the ancient Arctic dinosaurs of Alaska. Of the four Alaskan dinosaurs that have names, Fiorillo has named two of them: Pachyrhinosaurus perotorum and Nanuqsaurus hoglundi, which he named in honor of wealthy Texans. P. perotorum is christened after the billionaire Ross Perot and his family. Although Perot is not necessarily connected to Alaska or paleontology, he has given generously to the Perot Museum, which also bears his name. N. hoglundi is named for Forrest Hoglund, a Texas oil millionaire who has also donated generously. Fiorillo and his colleagues have unearthed new polar dinosaurs as well as obtained insights into the ancient polar climate during one of Earth's greenhouse modes.  In addition to Alaska, he has also traveled around the United States and to parts of Asia, Australia, and South America in order to further his research.

Published work

Books
Anthony Fiorillo has collaborated on these books and volumes: 
 
 
 Fiorillo, Anthony, R., and McCarthy, Paul, J.  2010.  Ancient polar ecosystems and environments.  Selected papers based on Geological Society of America Annual Meeting, Theme Session 10, Ancient polar ecosystems and environments: proxies for understanding climate change and global warming.  Palaeogeography, Palaeoclimatology, Palaeoecology 295:345-442.
 McCarthy, Paul, J., Fiorillo, Anthony, R., and Taylor, Edith, L. 2016. Ancient polar ecosystems and paleoclimate in deep time: Evidence from the past, implications for the future. Palaeogeography, Palaeoclimatology, Palaeoecology.  441:223-389.

He has also written the following book:
 Fiorillo, Anthony, R., 2018.  Alaska Dinosaurs: an Ancient Arctic World.  CRC Press, Boca Raton.  224p.   https://www.crcpress.com/Alaska-Dinosaurs-An-Ancient-Arctic-World/Fiorillo/p/book/9781138060876

Other publications

Personal life
Dr. Fiorillo currently resides in the Dallas area.

References

Living people
American paleontologists
University of Connecticut alumni
University of Pennsylvania alumni
University of Nebraska alumni
Fellows of the Geological Society of America
1957 births